Jair Diego Alves de Brito (born 15 April 2001), commonly known as Jajá, is a Brazilian footballer who plays as a midfielder for Russian club Torpedo Moscow.

Club career
On 19 February 2023, Jajá joined Russian Premier League club Torpedo Moscow on loan.

Career statistics

Honours
Athletico Paranaense
Campeonato Paranaense: 2020

References

External links
Torpedo Moscow profile 

2001 births
People from Catanduva
Footballers from São Paulo (state)
Living people
Brazilian footballers
Association football forwards
Brazil under-20 international footballers
Club Athletico Paranaense players
Clube de Regatas Brasil players
Cruzeiro Esporte Clube players
FC Torpedo Moscow players
Campeonato Brasileiro Série A players
Campeonato Brasileiro Série B players
Campeonato Paranaense players
Russian Premier League players
Brazilian expatriate footballers
Brazilian expatriate sportspeople in Russia
Expatriate footballers in Russia